António Filipe Norinho de Carvalho (born 14 April 1985), known as António Filipe, is a Portuguese professional footballer who plays as a goalkeeper for C.F. Estrela da Amadora.

Club career

Paços Ferreira
Born in Foz do Sousa, Gondomar, Porto District, António Filipe began his career with hometown club Gondomar S.C. in Segunda Liga. In August 2009, following their relegation, he signed a four-year contract with F.C. Paços de Ferreira. Almost exclusively a backup during his spell at the Estádio da Mata Real, he made his Primeira Liga debut on 12 September 2010 when starter Cássio was sent off shortly before the hour-mark of the 1–1 away draw against C.S. Marítimo.

Chaves
On 26 June 2015, António Filipe agreed to a one-year deal at second-tier G.D. Chaves. He played a career-best 30 matches (31 overall) in his first season, which ended in promotion, and then extended his link for another year.

In 2017, António Filipe renewed his contract until 30 June 2019. During his tenure, he constantly battled for first-choice status with Ricardo Nunes.

Estoril
Aged 34, António Filipe joined G.D. Estoril Praia on a one-year deal on 6 June 2019.

References

External links

1985 births
Living people
People from Gondomar, Portugal
Sportspeople from Porto District
Portuguese footballers
Association football goalkeepers
Primeira Liga players
Liga Portugal 2 players
Gondomar S.C. players
F.C. Paços de Ferreira players
G.D. Chaves players
G.D. Estoril Praia players
C.D. Nacional players
C.F. Estrela da Amadora players
Saudi First Division League players
Al-Jabalain FC players
Portuguese expatriate footballers
Expatriate footballers in Saudi Arabia
Portuguese expatriate sportspeople in Saudi Arabia